The University of Natal was a university in the former South African province Natal which later became KwaZulu-Natal. The University of Natal no longer exists as a distinct legal entity, as it was incorporated into the University of KwaZulu-Natal on 1 January 2004. It was founded in 1910 as the Natal University College in Pietermaritzburg and expanded to include a campus in Durban in 1931. In 1947, the university opened a medical school for non-white students in Durban. The Pietermaritzburg campus was known for its agricultural engineering programmes, hence the nickname "the farmers" whilst the Durban campus was known as "the engineers," as it concentrated on other engineering programmes.

The Council of the University of Natal voted on 31 May 2002 to offer the post of Vice-Chancellor and University Principal to world-renowned medical scientist and former Medical Research Council President - Professor Malegapuru Makgoba who assumed office on the 1 September 2002. He was entrusted with leading the University of Natal into the merger with the University of Durban-Westville. In so doing, he became the last Vice-Chancellor of the University of Natal. Professor Makgoba succeeded Professor Brenda Gourley as Vice-Chancellor.

Brenda Gourley, a qualified chartered accountant, was the second last vice-chancellor of the University of Natal. Her appointment at the university in 1994 was an historical event in South Africa. She was the first woman in South Africa to be appointed as a vice-chancellor of a South African university.

The Maritime law programme based at the then Institute of Maritime Law at the University of Natal, which was pioneered under the headship of Professor Hilton Staniland, was one of the first Maritime law programmes of its kind in South Africa. The above institute was well known in South African Maritime circles. A number of South African statutes regulating the South African maritime industry were drafted by Professor Hilton Staniland at the above Institute, including the Carriage of Goods by Sea Act 1 of 1986 and the Wreck and Salvage Act 94 of 1996.

The main science block on the Howard College campus, completed in the early 1980s, was a pivotal location for biological research and game conservation for the province. The Howard College campus in Durban was strung out along the Berea, a ridge to the north of the Durban city centre.

Under apartheid, the Howard College Campus, in Durban, was known for the activism of its staff and students against government-imposed racial segregation. Particularly in the 1960s Natal University students were active in the non-racial National Union of South African Students, which was one of the main organizations opposing the apartheid system.  In the 1970s and 1980s many of its students were members of the often-banned South African Students' Organisation (SASO), centred on the main arts centre at the Howard College campus. In addition, the university magazine Dome (named for the dome of the Howard College Building), was active against apartheid and was often banned, with the printing press being moved around to prevent its being confiscated by police.

The Howard College campus had a number of onsite residences, named after prominent South Africans including John Bews, Ernest Jansen, Louis Botha and Mabel Palmer.

The Pietermartizburg campus was the original campus, though it later became the smaller of the two main campuses. The campus is in a suburban location, centred on the library and administration buildings. The library houses many historic books, including books on colonial history and Boer war history. Unlike the Durban campus, most students did not live in campus residences.

On 1 January 2004, the University of Natal was merged with the University of Durban-Westville to create a new legal entity called the University of KwaZulu-Natal, as part of a broader reorganisation of South African universities.

Alumni

References

External links 

 
Universities in KwaZulu-Natal
Defunct universities and colleges in South Africa
Educational institutions established in 1910
Educational institutions disestablished in 2004
1910 establishments in South Africa
2004 disestablishments in South Africa